Ağaçören District is a district of Aksaray Province of Turkey. Its seat is the town Ağaçören. Its area is 407 km2, and its population is 7,633 (2021).

Composition
There is one municipality in Ağaçören District:
 Ağaçören

There are 27 villages in Ağaçören District:

 Abalı
 Abdiuşağı
 Ahırlı
 Avşar
 Çatalçeşme
 Dadılar
 Demircili
 Göllü
 Göynük
 Güzelöz
 Hacıahmetlidavutlu
 Hacıahmetlitepeköy
 Hacıismailli
 Hüsrevköy
 Kaşıçalıklar
 Kederli
 Kılıçlı
 Kırımini
 Kurtini
 Kütüklü
 Oymaağaç
 Sarıağıl
 Sarıhasanlı
 Sofular
 Yağmurhüyüğü
 Yenice
 Yenişabanlı

References

Districts of Aksaray Province